The Parc des expositions de Paris-Nord Villepinte (English: Paris Nord Villepinte) is a large convention center located in Villepinte near Paris-Charles de Gaulle Airport. The center opened in 1982 and is the second-largest in France. The center encompasses 115 hectares and has 246,000 m2 of convention space in eight halls. The center is served by the Parc des Expositions station on the RER B. Paris Nord Villepinte is one metro stop from Charles de Gaulle Airport and 30 minutes from Gare du Nord, Chatelet-Les Halles, Saint Michel RER B stations in Paris city.
Managed by Viparis, Paris Nord Villepinte Convention and Exhibition Centre hosts many international professional and consumer exhibitions and conventions, such as All4pack, Europain, Eurosatory, Expofil, Intermat, Maison & Objet, SIAL, Silmo and IPA.

References

External links 

 Official website

Convention centers in France
Buildings and structures in Seine-Saint-Denis